DENIS 0255−4700 is an extremely faint brown dwarf approximately 16 light years from the Solar System in the southern constellation of Eridanus. It is the closest isolated L brown dwarf (no undiscovered L-dwarfs are expected to be closer), and only after the binary Luhman 16. It is also the faintest brown dwarf (with the absolute magnitude of MV=24.44) having measured visible magnitude. A number of nearer T and Y-type dwarfs are known, specifically WISE 0855−0714, Epsilon Indi B and C, SCR 1845-6357 B, DEN 1048−3956, and UGPS 0722−05.

History of observations
DENIS 0255−4700 was identified for the first time as a probable nearby object in 1999. Its proximity to the Solar System was established by the RECONS group in 2006 when its trigonometric parallax was measured.

Properties
The photospheric temperature of DENIS 0255−4700 is estimated at about 1300 K. Its atmosphere in addition to hydrogen and helium contains water vapor, methane and possibly ammonia. The mass of DENIS 0255−4700 lies in the range from 25 to 65 Jupiter masses corresponding to the age range from 0.3 to 10 billion years. The brown dwarf is rotating rapidly with the period of 1.7 hours, and its rotational axis is inclined 40 degrees from the line-of-sight.

See also
List of nearest stars and brown dwarfs
List of brown dwarfs
Research Consortium On Nearby Stars

References

Notes

External links
 RECONS List of the 100 nearest stars

Eridanus (constellation)
Brown dwarfs
DENIS objects
J02550357-4700509
Local Bubble
L-type stars